was the second ship of the two  pre-dreadnought battleships built for the Imperial Japanese Navy (IJN) in the first decade of the 20th century, the last to be built by British shipyards. Ordered just before the start of the Russo-Japanese War of 1904–1905, the ship was completed a year after its end. She saw no combat during World War I, although the ship was present when Japan joined the Siberian Intervention in 1918. Kashima was disarmed and scrapped in 1923–1924 in accordance with the terms of the Washington Naval Treaty of 1922.

Design and description

The Katori-class ships were ordered just before the start of the Russo-Japanese War in 1904 as improved versions of the Royal Navy's s. The ship was powered by two vertical triple-expansion steam engines using steam generated by 20 Niclausse boilers.

The ship's main battery consisted of four 12-inch guns mounted in two twin-gun turrets, one forward and one aft. The secondary armament consisted of four 10-inch guns mounted in four single-gun turrets positioned on each side of the superstructure. Katori also carried twelve six-inch guns, mounted in casemates on the sides of the hull and in the superstructure. A number of smaller guns were carried for defence against torpedo boats. These included a dozen QF 12-pounder guns and three  3-pounder Hotchkiss guns. She was also armed with five submerged 18-inch torpedo tubes, two on each broadside and one in the stern.

Construction and career
Kashima, named for a Shinto shrine in Kashima, Ibaraki, was ordered in January 1904 from Armstrong Whitworth. The ship was laid down at their Elswick shipyard on 29 February 1904 as yard number 755. She was launched on 22 March 1905, and completed on 23 May 1906. Kashima departed Britain on 31 May on her maiden voyage and shakedown cruise and arrived at Yokosuka on 4 August 1906.

Whilst conducting gunnery training in Hiroshima Bay on 16 September 1907, brown powder propellant in Kashimas starboard rear  gun mount ignited when it came in contact with burning residue from the previous shot. The fire killed seven officers and 27 enlisted men and wounded two officers and six enlisted men.

When World War I began, Kashima was in a refit at Maizuru Naval Arsenal that lasted until March 1915. The ship was assigned to the 2nd Battleship Squadron when her refit was completed and became the squadron's flagship in 1916. Kashima joined her sister ship  in the 5th Battleship Squadron as its flagship in 1918 and both ships covered the landing of Japanese troops in Siberia in August of that year as Japan intervened in the Russian Civil War.

On 3 March 1921, Katori, escorted by Kashima, departed Yokohama bound for Great Britain carrying Crown Prince Hirohito, the first Japanese crown prince to travel abroad. The ships arrived at Portsmouth on 9 May and Hirohito disembarked to tour Europe; they returned home several months later. To comply with the terms of the Washington Naval Treaty the ship was disarmed in April 1922, stricken from the Navy List on 20 September 1923 and the removal of her armor was completed by February 1924. Mitsubishi won the public auction conducted 26–27 April with a price of 238,900 yen and had to pay an additional 35,000 yen to have her towed to Nagasaki for scrapping. The company finished the job on 24 November. Her guns were turned over to the Imperial Japanese Army for use as coastal artillery; her main gun turrets were installed around Tokyo Bay and on Iki Island in the Strait of Tsushima. The rest of her guns were placed in reserve and ultimately scrapped in 1943.

Notes

References

External links

 Materials of the Imperial Japanese Navy
 New York Times, 18 September 1907

Katori-class battleships
Ships built by Armstrong Whitworth
Ships built on the River Tyne
1905 ships
World War I battleships of Japan